No Gettin' Out is the first studio album by The Ducky Boys. It was recorded and released in 1997.

Track listing

Band members
 Mark Lind - bass guitar, vocals
 Mike Mardsen - guitar, vocals
 Jason Messina - drums

External links

1997 debut albums
The Ducky Boys albums